Frederick Brook Hitch (1897–1957) was a British sculptor, the son of the architectural sculptor Nathaniel Hitch. He attended the Royal Academy Schools and was a Fellow of the Royal Society of British Sculptors. He lived in Hertford, Hertfordshire, England.

Works

Church and other architectural sculpture

Church and other architectural sculpture

War memorials

Images of the National Submarine War Memorial

Images of the RSPCA Animals Memorial Dispensary

Harwich Royal Navy Reserve Auxiliary Patrol and Minesweepers Memorial

Other works: public statues
 A statue of Captain Matthew Flinders on North Terrace, Adelaide.
 Statue of Sir Ross Smith in the Creswell Gardens, near Adelaide Oval.
The bronze statue of the hymn-writer Charles Wesley at the Methodist chapel in Bristol. Charles Wesley (1707–1788) was the younger brother of John Wesley. He composed about 9,000 hymns during his lifetime, such as "Love Divine, All Loves Excelling" and "Hark, the Herald Angels Sing". The Brook Hitch bronze statue stands in the back courtyard of the Methodist chapel and has the motif "O let me commend my Saviour to you".
Statue of Nelson in Portsmouth. This was erected in 1951, originally in Pembroke Gardens, Southsea, but moved to the Portsmouth Grand Parade in 2005.
 A statue of Sir Robert de Mantell in the grounds of Beeleigh Abbey in Essex. Sir Robert de Mantell was the founder of Beeleigh Abbey.
 A statue of Saint Giles for St Giles' Church in Haughton, Staffordshire.

Other works: public statues

Exhibitions
Brook Hitch exhibited at the Royal Academy from 1906 to 1947. Until 1914, his exhibits were mostly classical subjects. In 1917 he showed a medal commemorating the Victory of Jutland Bank. Thereafter he exhibited portraits, with the exception of a work entitled Grief, shown in 1924. In 1926 Hitch submitted maquettes in the competition for the award of the Canadian National War Memorial in Ottawa. Although he was not awarded the commission, his design was shown at the Royal Academy in 1926.

References

1897 births
1957 deaths
English sculptors
English male sculptors
20th-century British sculptors